This Will Be the Death of Us is the second studio album by American rock band Set Your Goals, released on July 21, 2009, on Epitaph Records. Following the release of their debut album Mutiny! in 2006, the group discovered they were not being paid royalties. After a prolonged battle to terminate their contract, the band began working on their second album in late 2008. They spent March 2008 recording with producer Mike Green in Los Angeles, California. Friends from other bands contributed additional vocal performances on several songs. Preceded by supporting tours with New Found Glory and All Time Low, This Will Be the Death of Us was released through independent label Epitaph Records in July 2009.

Following the release, the group embarked on tours of Australia and the US, and appeared at the Reading and Leeds Festivals. Music videos were released for the title-track and "Summer Jam". This was followed by a support slot for Mayday Parade in the US; a European tour closed out the year. Further tours of the US, Australia and the UK (including an appearance at the Slam Dunk Festival) followed, leading up to a stint on the Warped Tour and the release of a music video for "Gaia Bleeds (Make Way for Man)".

Viewed as a pop punk release, This Will Be the Death of Us tackled the themes of questioning authority and straight edge culture. It peaked at number 65 on the Billboard 200, and charted within the top thirty on three Billboard component charts—Independent Albums, Alternative Albums and Top Rock Albums. The album received a positive reception from some critics, with a number of them praising the improvement in production and highlighting the guest vocal performance by Hayley Williams of Paramore.

Background
Set Your Goals released their debut album Mutiny! through the independent record label Eulogy Recordings in July 2006. In December 2007, guitarist Dave Yoha left the band as he no longer wanted to tour full time; he was replaced temporarily by former member Dan Coddaire, who initially played in the band in 2006. In February 2008, vocalist Jordan Brown said the group had been "busy working on new songs over the last few months". In May 2008, the band posted "The Fallen..." online. Sometime afterward, guitarist Audelio Flores Jr. said the group had been writing and were working on new songs. Drummer Mike Ambrose said they had done a bit of demoing and had skeletons of songs.

The band attracted interest from Pete Wentz of Fall Out Boy, who wanted to sign the band to his label Decaydance. However, after Brown broke a stage monitor during a Fall Out Boy show and could not pay for it, Wentz signed another band instead. The group were not being paid any royalties for Mutiny! or merchandise sales by Eulogy Recordings founder John Wylie. They could not afford to audit Wylie; their manager Dave Crisafi, who was an employee of the label, would always take Eulogy's side when the issue of payment arose. Matt Wilson, the band's vocalist, claimed the band's members were naïve at the time, and upon learning that this was not the typical way things were done, they fired Crisafi.

When the band sought to terminate their recording contract with Eulogy, Wylie wanted what Wilson called "an astronomical amount" of money. One of the group's new managers, Chris Allen, personally planned to buy the band out of the contract for $125,000. However, their second manager Keith Lazorchak contacted independent label Epitaph Records, who had an interest in buying out the contract. On August 18, 2008, it was announced that the band was free from their contract with Eulogy. A portion of it was paid up-front with the remainder being recouped later through sales of their second album.

Production
The same day the group were freed from their contract, it was revealed that they were in the process of writing their next album. Though Flores said the group were going to be recording in October and November, they were still in the writing process. On October 30, Coddaire had officially re-joined the group. Epitaph founder Brett Gurewitz wanted the band to enlist the services of a 1990s-style punk producer, however, the group wanted to work with someone who had experience with pop acts. Vocalist Matt Wilson explained: "We know how to do the fast punk thing; we wanted a more polished sound to it." They began working with Mike Green for pre-production and demoing, before eventually enlisting him as the album's producer. Sessions took place at the Tree Fort in Los Angeles, California, with Green at the helm in February 2009.

Numerous friends sang crowd vocals throughout the album, while some contributed additional vocals to specific tracks: Anthony Benedict on "Summer Jam", recorded by  Andy Nelson at Bricktop Studios in Chicago, Illinois; I Am the Avalanche frontman Vinnie Caruana on the title-track, recorded by Hugh Pool at Excello Recordings in Brooklyn, New York City; New Found Glory guitarist Chad Gilbert on "Our Ethos: A Legacy to Pass On", recorded by Green at the Tree Fort; Turmoil frontman Jon Gula on "Gaia Bleeds (Make Way for Man)", recorded by John Gardner in his basement; and Paramore frontwoman Hayley Williams on "The Few That Remain", recorded by Roger Nichols at the Skyview Church of Tone and Soul in East Nashville, Tennessee. Green recorded extra guitars on "Summer Jam"; Brown recorded vocals for "With Hoffmain Lenses We Will See the Truth" with Cyrus Bolooki on New Found Glory's tour bus. The recording process was concluded in late March 2009; the tracks were mixed by David Bendeth, before being mastered by Ted Jensen at Sterling Sound.

Composition and lyrics

Musically described as pop punk, This Will Be the Death of Us drew comparisons to older punk rock bands such as Bad Religion and All. Lyrically, the album sees the group questioning authority, taking on life issues and straight edge culture. The album features various friends from other bands doing guest vocal performances; none of the features were planned, with Set Your Goals finding parts for them when they wanted to appear on the record. The title-track, "This Will Be the Death of Us", begins with fast tempo punk drums alongside catchy guitar parts. It has Wilson and Brown harmonizing throughout; the track is closed with a verse sung by Caruana. "With Hoffman Lenses We Will See the Truth" incorporates Brown doing media presenter vocals; "Look Closer" covers the theme of complacency.

"Summer Jam" talks about Set Your Goals' early years of touring, and incorporates the intermittent use of a synthesizer. Part of its lyrics refer to an incident that saw the band, Fireworks and members of their touring crew arrested while at a mall. Tony Bologna, who did merchandise for Fireworks, had managed to escape; he subsequently sung the line "I'm just trying to get my smoothie on, dog" in the song. "Like You to Me" is filled with honest introspection. "The Fallen..." retains the sound of its earlier demo with sharper production, and talks about the group's problems with both Eulogy Records and other labels in general. The track acts as a textbook example of a Set Your Goals song: high-energy power chords, singled-out lead guitar work driven by punk drum beats. It also displays the duelling vocals between Brown and Wilson, alongside gang vocals.

With "The Few That Remain", the music halts, Williams asks, "Whoa, whoa, guys, um, is it cool if I get in on this here?", before the music restarts with her part. "Equals" has the band reassuring fans that they are like them, and sees Brown talking about his personal failures. "Gaia Bleeds (Make Way for Man)", is the heaviest track the band has written, and features Gula. "Arrival Notes" serves as an acoustic instrumental interlude. "Flawed Methods of Persecution & Punishment" contains socially aware lyricism that is disguised by gang vocals. "Our Ethos: A Legacy to Pass On" is indebted to 1990s skate punk, and features vocals from Gilbert. The band initially planned for Toby Morse of H2O to do it, however, when he became unavailable they drafted Gilbert. Jordan Pundik, also of New Found Glory, provides vocals on "The Lost Boys".

Release

In March 2009, Punknews.org reported that Set Your Goal's second album would be released in four months' time. On March 24, 2009, it was announced that the band had signed to Epitaph Records, and that their next album would be titled This Will Be the Death of Us. Between late March and early May, the band supported New Found Glory on their headlining tour of the US, leading up to an appearance at The Bamboozle festival. On May 25, 2009, the album's track listing and artwork were posted online. After this, the band went on a brief tour of Japan with All Time Low. On June 2, the band said that if 5,000 people retweeted one of their tweets, they would release a track, and the following day, "This Will Be the Death of Us" was posted on their Myspace profile. Shortly afterwards, the band toured Australia as part of the Take Action Tour. On June 18, 2009, "Gaia Bleeds (Make Way for Man)" was posted on Myspace.

On June 30, 2009, a music video was released for "This Will Be the Death of Us", which was filmed in a warehouse in Los Angeles, California. The band perform in said building, cut with shots of Brown and Wilson separately singing on a stairwell and inside of an elevator. In July and August 2009, the band went on a co-headlining US tour with Four Year Strong; main support came from Fireworks, while the Swellers, Grave Maker, Drive A and A Loss for Words appeared on select shows. While on this tour, This Will Be the Death of Us was made available for streaming on July 17, 2009 through Myspace, before being release three days later. The Japanese edition featured "The Lost Boys" as a bonus track. Further dates were added to the group's tour, extending it into late August; later that month, the group performed at the Reading and Leeds Festivals.

On September 23, a music video was released for "Summer Jam". It consists of live performances, photo shoots and driving across the country. Between late September and mid-November, the band supported Mayday Parade on the AP Fall Ball Tour. The band dropped off a few shows citing health issues. Shortly after this, "The Lost Boys" was made available for streaming in October 2009. In  November and December 2009, the group embarked on a European tour with Broadway Calls and Fireworks. In January and February 2010, Set Your Goals supported Motion City Soundtrack on their headlining tour of the US, which was followed by performances at Soundwave music festival in Australia in February and March. After this, the band went on a cross-country US tour with support from Comeback Kid, the Wonder Years and This Time Next Year. Between late June and early August, the band performed on Warped Tour. On July 10, a music video was released for "Gaia Bleeds (Make Way for Man)"; the clip sees the group challenge "American greed and destructive wastefulness", interspersed with facts about the earth's devastation.

Reception

This Will Be the Death of Us received positive reviews from some music critics. Scott Heisel of Alternative Press complimented Wilson's "drastically improved vocals", with him being able to step out of Brown's shadow and praised William's guest spot as being the most memorable. AbsolutePunk staff member Drew Beringer viewed it as being akin to the Power Rangers—"the tracks are awesome individually, but become unstoppable when listened to together." He saw it as an improvement "in every way" compared to Mutiny!, with the band coming across as "spectacular" in crafting a "catchy hook without it sounding glossy and overproduced." Ultimate Guitar applauded the improved production style and inventive guitar riffs. While noting Brown and Wilson's distinct vocal stylings, they manage to "sync up perfectly with each other." Rock Sound writer Andrew Kelham simply labelled it as "another solid record" that is "easy and digestible yet rambunctious and chaotic." AllMusic reviewer Pemberton Roach noted the "step up" in the production with a "crisp, clean, snap-tight sound." He found the group's "mature, positive attitude" mixing effectively with the "music's youthful exuberance", showcasing a record that is " both musically captivating and refreshingly non-preachy."

The 405 Rob Evans said the record did not "really come close" to besting Mutiny!, with the band "los[ing] their spark." He added that the release "lacks the quickfire urgency" that Mutiny! had; despite these negatives Evans called it "a great album" overall.   Ox-Fanzine writer Christin Pausch said it contained a "few catchy tunes" and called it a "worthy successor", however, it "doesn't hit [you in] the face like Mutiny [does]." Punknews.org staff member Joe Pelone considered the record a sophomore slump, criticizing the "roughly 1,300 guest vocalists on this g.d. album", though singling Williams' performance as a highlight. The overall emotion he got from the album was disappointment with a number of the earlier tracks blending together. NME was highly critical of the group's "attempt to inculcate and lead a Generation Next-style movement ... is a pathetically polished war cry", lambasting it as "unlikely to stir a teen from their slumber with its vacuous and laminated scuzzy guff, let alone inspire the rebellion it desires."

This Will Be the Death of Us peaked at number 65 on the US Billboard 200. In addition, it charted on three Billboard component charts: number 10 on Independent Albums, number 22 on Alternative Albums, and number 27 on Top Rock Albums.

Track listing
Track listing per booklet.

Personnel
Personnel per booklet, except where noted.

Set Your Goals
 Matt Wilsonlead vocals
 Jordan Brownlead vocals, guitars, media vocals (track 2)
 Daniel Coddaireguitars
 Audelio Flores Jr.guitars
 Joe Saucedobass guitar
 Mike Ambrosedrums

Additional musicians
 Anthony Benedictvocals (track 4), crowd vocals
 Vinnie Caruanavocals (track 1)
 Chad Gilbertvocals (track 12), crowd vocals
 Jon Gulavocals (track 9)
 Hayley Williamsvocals (track 7), crowd vocals
 Jordan Pundikvocals (track 13)
 Mike Greenguitars (track 4)
 Tom Ambellancrowd vocals

Additional musicians (cont'd)
 Ryan Blankcrowd vocals
 Brian Bumbliscrowd vocals
 Michael Bumbliscrowd vocals
 Chris Clarkcrowd vocals
 Hannah Donovancrowd vocals
 Efren Gonzalezcrowd vocals
 Pete Grossmancrowd vocals
 Brett Jonescrowd vocals
 Dave Mackindercrowd vocals
 Garth McKeecrowd vocals
 Chris Mojancrowd vocals
 Todd Neifcrowd vocals
 Kyle O'Neilcrowd vocals
 Seth Morikawacrowd vocals
 Donny Phillipscrowd vocals
 James Phillipscrowd vocals

Additional musicians (cont'd)
 John Regancrowd vocals
 Tymm Rengerscrowd vocals
 Set Your Goals crowd vocals
Production
 Mike Greenproducer, engineer
 David Bendethmixing
 Ted Jensenmastering
 Andy Nelsonrecording
 Hugh Poolrecording
 John Gardnerrecording
 Roger Nicholsrecording
 Cyrus Bolookirecording
 Drew Millwardconcept, layout
 Rob Dobiportrait illustration
 Matt Graysonphotos

Charts

References

External links 

 This Will Be the Death of Us at YouTube (streamed copy where licensed)

2009 albums
Set Your Goals (band) albums
Epitaph Records albums
Albums produced by Mike Green (record producer)